Pradeep Adatrow is an Indian-American dental educator, researcher and clinician. He is a board certified Periodontist and Prosthodontists in the United States. He is an Associate Professor  at the University of Tennessee.

Early life and education 
He was born in Vizag, India and immigrated to the United States and grew up in Indianapolis, Indiana. Adatrow went to College at University of Alabama with a major in Epidemiology and Biostatistics. Later, he received a Doctor of Dental Surgery from the University of Tennessee, Memphis. Furthermore, he pursued a 3-year residency in Periodontics and Implant Dentistry at the Indiana University and another 3-year residency in Prosthodontics from the University of Tennessee, Memphis. He is board certified by American Academy of Periodontology and is inducted as a Fellow in International College of Dentistry.

Awards 
He was inducted into the Deans Odonatological society and Deans Society.

Research 
Adatrow and his Colleagues have carried out research on Chitosan and its use as a vehicle for bone regeneration.  He also has been researching the prevention of peri-implantitis using Biomaterial strategies to prevent or eliminate initial bacterial attachment. He also has done clinical studies looking into the viability of Mini Dental Implants for long term clinical use. Adatrow has co-authored several articles in peer-reviewed journals on bone regeneration using chitosan, peri-implantitis, small diameter implants (mini-implants).

References

External links 

Diplomate American Board of Periodontology
Fellow International College of Dentistry
Associate Professor, UTHSC
Publications
Wikihow Profile
Faculty Profile
Bizjournal Article
Healthline Article
Yahoo News Article

21st-century American dentists
American people of Telugu descent
Indian emigrants to the United States
Indiana University alumni
Living people
Periodontists
University of Alabama alumni
University of Tennessee faculty
Year of birth missing (living people)